on the Hankyu Arashiyama Line is located a short walk from both the Katsura River and Matsunoo Shrine in Kyoto. During the late fall, the Momiji trees that line the station provide a spectacular display of red, orange, and yellow leaves. The station is accessible by wheelchairs although passengers of Katsura-bound trains have to use a special gate for wheelchairs.

Kyoto Bus #73 to Kyoto Station also connects to the station.

History
The station opened on November 9, 1928, when the Arashiyama Line started operation. It was called , referring to Matsuo Shrine, until 1948 and then  until 2013. The present name is from December 21, 2013.

References

External links

Matsuo-taisha Station information by Hankyu Railway 

Railway stations in Japan opened in 1928
Railway stations in Kyoto